Kolar or Kolara is a city in the Indian state of Karnataka. It is the headquarters of Kolar district. The city is known for its milk production and gold mines. It is also known for Someshwara temple and Kolaramma temple.

History 

The Western Gangas sovereignty lasted from about 350 to 550 CE, initially ruled from Kolar as their Capital City. The founder of the Western Ganga dynasty was Konganivarman Madhava, who built Kolar as his capital around 350 and ruled for about twenty years. He was succeeded by his son Madhava I. Kolar, the headquarters of the Kolar district, was earlier known as Kuvalalapura, also known as Kolahala Pura. Historically, Kolar is said to be associated with the epic age, which recalls many legends associated with Avani in Mulbagal Taluk, which was also called Avani Kshetra.

It was once known as Avantika - Kshetra, a sacred place in Kolar district in Karnataka State. It was famous for its religious establishments from ancient times. It was once known as Aavanya which was under the Ganga prince Madhava Muttarasa, who governed several districts. In about AD 890, its earliest grant relates that Tribhuvana Kartara Deva, who held the title of Kali Yuga Rudra, ruled over the Avaniya Thana for 40 years. During this period he constructed 50 temples and two large tanks. Maharshi Valmiki, the author of the epic Ramayana, lived here. The legend goes further to establish that Seetha Devi, after being sent to exile, gave birth to her twins Lava and Kusha at Avani. The Avani continued to survive as a religious establishment from the 9th to 11th centuries. There are temples dedicated to Lord Rama.

The hill to the west of Kolar called the Shatasringa Parvata or 'Hundred-Peaked Mountain' is 'Antharagange', associated with the story of Parasurama and his fight with King Kartaviryarjuna over Surabhi, the divine cow. As the story goes, King Kartavirya Arjuna (Sahasrarjuna) and his army visited Jamadagni, Parasurama's father, when the king demanded the magical cow from Jamadagni. When Jamadagni refused, the King sent his soldiers to take the cow, but Parashurama killed the entire army and the king with his axe. In return, the princes beheaded Jamadagni. Thus, Parasurama took an oath to behead the entire Kshatriya race, which is said to have taken place on the hills. It is said that the 'kolahala' on the death of Kartaviryarjuna gave its name to the town, which later become Kolar. Kannada and tamil (tamils worked in Gold mines) languages are widely spoken. Gangas built the temple of Sri Uttameshwara temple in  Uttanur  Mulbagal Taluk.

Antaragange is one of the tourist attractions Of Kolar. It is also known as "Dakshina Kashi Kshetra". In the temple is a pond which gets a continuous flow of underground water from the mouth of a Basava (stone bull).

Geography

The city is located on the southern maidan (plains) region of Karnataka. The Ammerallikere, a tank, forms its eastern boundary. To the north is the Kodikannur tank, the main source of water supply to the city. The nearest railway junction is Bangarapet Junction railway station. Kolar is having good road transportation than, Rail amenities. It is situated on the Bengaluru - Chennai National Highway-75.

Kolar is also The gateway for Tirumala and Chennai via National Highway 75

Demographics

 2011 census, Kolar city municipality had a population of 138,462 and has 30,506 households. The population of scheduled castes in the city is 16,536, while that of scheduled tribes is 2094. The city has grown at the rate of 21.56% in the last decade.

The municipality had a sex ratio of 978 females per 1,000 males and 11.5% of the population were under six years old. Effective literacy was 84.02%; male literacy was 87.28% and female literacy was 80.69%.
[Kannada] and [Telugu] are widely spoken in city

Governance and politics
Kolar city is governed by Kolar City Municipal Council. The municipality covers an area of 18.3 square km and is divided into 35 wards, each represented by a councillor. It is headed by the Municipal Commissioner, R. Srikanth. The president is the elected head, currently incumbent B.M. Mubarak. The executive wing has 8 departments: Engineering, Health, Revenue, Town planning, Finance, Birth and death, Election and Day-NULM.

k H muniyappa is the 7 time winning member of parliament from kolar lok sabha constituency 

And now the city is represented by Member of Parliament elected from the Kolar Lok Sabha constituency is Muniswamy of the Bharatiya Janata Party. Srinivas Gowda is the MLA elected from the Karnataka Legislative Assembly.

Civic utilities 
The masterplan of the city is developed by the Urban Development Department, State of Karnataka. Kodikannur tank in the north of the city is its main source of water supply. The city has a shortage of drinking water, being an area with a 'permanent drought', and pipes being over 35 years old. Water is also supplied from four borewells at Maderahalli tank, and five more borewells that were revived in April 2020. According to the city municipality's website, the city receives a total of 56.20 MLD water, at 125 LPCD per capita.

The city has both open and closed drains. Kolar receives wastewater from Bengaluru as part of the KC project, which was expected to increase groundwater levels but has received criticism when it started contaminating the area. In 2017, it was reported that non-clearance of garbage by the municipal council had caused unhygienic conditions in the city.

Tourist attractions

Transportation 
Kolar has transportation amenities such as Buses, Taxis, and Auto Rickshaws.

Kolar also has a local transportation facility " Antaragange Kolara Nagara Sarige" which was inaugurated in July 2012 but Govt has stopped this services and utilising these buses for rural areas.

Railways

The district headquarters has a railway station connecting two destinations:

1. Bengaluru - Via Bangarapet Junction railway station

The nearest junction to Kolar is Bangarapet Junction railway station. It is the first railway junction in Karnataka on  Chennai Central– Bengaluru City line

2. Bengaluru - Via Srinivaspura, Chinthamani, Sidlaghatta, Chikkaballapura, Devanahalli, Yelahanka

Educational institutes 
 Bengaluru North University, Sri Devaraj Urs Extension, NH 75, Tamaka, Kolar-563103.
 Sri Devaraj Urs Medical College (SDUMC) - Next to Horticulture college, NH 75, Tamaka, Kolar-563103.

Notable people 
 

 M. Visvesvaraya  – Celebrated Indian Engineer and Statesman, also known as "Father of Indian Engineering" and "The architect of modern Karnataka".
 D. V. Gundappa – was an Indian writer, Kannada poet and philosopher .
 Masti Venkatesha Iyengar – Kannada poet and recipient of Jnanpith Award
 B. K. S. Iyengar -  Founder of the style of yoga as exercise known as "Iyengar Yoga", considered one of the foremost yoga gurus in the world.
 N. R. Narayana Murthy -  is an Indian billionaire businessman and the founder of Infosys.
 K. C. Reddy – First Chief Minister of Karnataka, (then Mysore State)
 Hyder Ali – Ruler of Mysore Kingdom, Father of Tippu Sultan.
 Prashanth Neel- Renowned Indian Movie Director of  K.G.F: Chapter 1 and K.G.F: Chapter 2 fame.
 A. N. Prahlada Rao highest Crossword writer in India.
 K. H. Muniyappa – is an Indian Politician.He is a member of the Indian National Congress (INC) political party.
 Mallikarjuna Reddy – Guinness World Record holder, Micro Artist , Miniature artist.
 S. Muniswamy - is an Indian politician, a member of Bharatiya Janata Party (BJP) and MP of Kolar.

References

External links

 City Official Website

Cities and towns in Kolar district
Cities in Karnataka